Valvoline Instant Oil Change is a company that provides preventive maintenance services for many different types of automobiles. These services include oil changes, antifreeze changes, differential fluid changes, batteries, belts, fuel system cleaning service, lights, wipers and transmission fluid changes, and in states where services are contracted out by state regulatory agencies, emissions testing.  Valvoline oils and products are featured at all locations.

References 

American companies established in 1886
Retail companies established in 1886
Automotive part retailers of the United States
Automotive repair shops of the United States
Companies based in Lexington, Kentucky